Panteg and Griffithstown railway station was a railway station which served Griffithstown near Pontypool in Torfaen, South Wales, UK.

History

The station was opened by the Great Western Railway on 1 August 1880 on its line from Pontypool to Newport. Originally known as "Panteg", it was renamed "Panteg and Griffithstown" on 20 October 1898. The station had replaced an earlier station serving the area on the parallel Pontypool, Caerleon and Newport Railway to the east, which had opened in 1874. The second station closed to passengers on 30 April 1962 and to goods on 3 May 1965.

The platforms at the station were staggered and joined by a central footbridge. To the south was the goods shed, built in 1879, and from 2002 to 2011 the home of the Griffithstown Railway Museum. The station was adjacent to the Panteg Steel Works, with sidings into the site. The works were also served from the Pontypool, Caerleon and Newport Railway line. To the north of the station was Coedygric Junction between the N&PR and PC&NR lines, and the southernmost part of the railway yard complex at Pontypool.

The trackbed has been redeveloped into a cycle path, and the steelworks have been demolished and replaced by housing. As of 2019, the 'up' platform and buildings, which were derelict, have been demolished.

The project to remove the building was estimated to require 20,000 of funding. The building was removed in May 2016.

References

Notes

Sources

External links
Local photographs
Station on a navigable 1947 O.S. map

Disused railway stations in Torfaen
Railway stations in Great Britain opened in 1880
Railway stations in Great Britain closed in 1962
Former Great Western Railway stations